Best of the Specials is a budget compilation album by The Specials, released in 1996.

Track listing

1996 compilation albums
The Specials compilation albums